James or Jimmy Miles may refer to:

James John Miles (born 1959), British academic
James Albert Miles (1871–1953), inspector of schools in Western Australia
Boobie Miles (born 1970), high school football tail back, primary subject in the book Friday Night Lights: A Town, a Team, and a Dream
James Miles, journalist (see 2008 Tibetan unrest)
James Miles, politician in Minnesota gubernatorial election, 1974
Jimmy Miles (born 1967), American musician
Jimmy Miles (baseball), American baseball player

See also
Jim Miles (disambiguation)
James Myles (1877–1956), Irish soldier, politician and rugby union player